In computer slang, J. Random Hacker is  an arbitrary programmer (hacker).

"J. Random Hacker" is a popular placeholder name in a number of books and articles in programming. J. Random Hacker even authored a book about ease of malicious hacking, Adventures of a Wi-Fi Pirate. Also, J. Random Hacker was a main developer of I2P software.

Over time, J. Random X  has become a popular cliché or snowclone in computer lore, with more types of "random" (meaning "arbitrary") categories of people, such as "J. Random Newbie", J. Random User, or J. Random Luser.

See also 
 Alice and Bob, placeholder names often used when discussing computer security
 Acme Corporation, placeholder name often used to describe a company

References

Internet slang
Computer humor
Placeholder names